A Rib is a bone attached to the spine, in vertebrate animals.

Rib or RIB may also refer to:

Anatomy
 Ribs (food), the cooked meat and rib bones of a food animal
 Rib or costa, the leading edge of an insect wing (See Glossary of entomology terms)
 Rib, an angulated vertical line on the stem of cactus

Construction
 Rib (aeronautics), a longitudinal structural member in an aircraft wing responsible for maintaining its curvature.
 Rib (nautical), a lateral structural member connected to the keel between gunwales
 Rib, one type of transverse member in boat building
 Rib, any slender molded masonry arch projecting from a surface, particularly as part of an architectural vault
 Rib vault, a type of architectural vault in which the ribs are built first
 The sides of a violin or a guitar
 The sides of a tunnel

Others
 Rib (professional wrestling), a practical joke
 A type of escarpment seen in rib and groove topography
 A stitch pattern in knitting
 A tool used for shaping or smoothing pottery
 A type of fabric with closely woven yarn
 Ribs (recordings), gramophone recordings made from X-ray films

Acronyms
 RIB for Rigid inflatable boat, also rigid-hull inflatable boat or rigid-hulled inflatable boat
 RenderMan Interface Bytestream in 3D graphics
 Romanian International Bank
 Routing information base in computer networking 
 RIB Software, a German company 
 Roman Inscriptions of Britain, an archaeological reference book
 Retirement Insurance Benefits from the United States Social Security Administration
 Rwanda Investigation Bureau, law enforcement in Rwanda 
 Ryukyu Islands Boy Scouts, Japan 
 Renault Industrie Belgique, a Belgian plant of the Renault concern
 Remote Insight Board, for HP Integrated Lights-Out remote system management protocols

Music
 R.I.B. (album), a 2014 release by German metal band Tankard
 Razed in Black, an industrial music group
 Reign in Blood, an album by thrash metal band, Slayer
 Ribs (band) an American space rock/grime band
 "Ribs" (song) a 2013 song by Lorde from her album Pure Heroine